Harry Hookey is a singer-songwriter from Victoria, Australia.  His debut album Misdiagnosed was nominated for a 2014 ARIA Award for Best Blues & Roots Album. He is currently part of Desert Alien, a band with his brothers Jack Hookey and Jesse Kidd.

Hookey was educated at Cowwarr Primary School and was School Captain in 2000. Hookey holds degrees in Arts and Law from The University of Melbourne. His father taught him to play guitar at the age of 16, with Hookey starting his music career playing in country pubs in a family band with his father and two brothers. His first gig was at the Cowwarr Cricket Club Hotel.

After moving back to Australia after a stint in Nashville, Tennessee, he lived as a recluse for 3 years in ramshackle farmhouse in central Gippsland working on his musical abilities.

In 2021, he released his sophomore album as harry hook is real "No Snake in the Tree". Due to a record label complication, he can no longer release music as Harry Hookey.

Discography

Studio albums

Singles

Awards and nominations

ARIA Music Awards
The ARIA Music Awards is an annual awards ceremony that recognises excellence, innovation, and achievement across all genres of Australian music. 

|-
| 2014
| Misdiagnosed
| Best Blues & Roots Album
| 
|-

References

External links
Harry Hookey - Music Singer & Songwriter

Living people
Musicians from Melbourne
1988 births
21st-century Australian singers
21st-century Australian male singers